Sudan is a country in north-east Africa.

The term Sudan may also refer to the following:

Places
Sudan (region), geographic region running across Africa just south of the Sahel
Sudan, Iran, a village in Khuzestan Province, Iran
Sudan, Texas, a small town in Lamb County of West Texas in the United States
Sudan, Yemen, a village in the San‘a’ Governorate in western central Yemen
Sudan, Zira, a village in Punjab, India
Anglo-Egyptian Sudan, the former state of Sudan
Democratic Republic of the Sudan
French Sudan, a former French colony, present day Mali
Republic of the Sudan (1956–1969)
South Sudan, a separate country, which declared independence from Sudan in 2011
Sudanian Savanna, a belt of tropical savanna across the African continent
The Sudans

People
Madhusudan (disambiguation), the generic Indian name
Gabriel Sudan, Romanian mathematician
Madhu Sudan (born 1966), Indian computer scientist

Dyes
Sudan I
Sudan II
Sudan III
Sudan IV
Sudan Black B
Sudan Red G

Other uses
 Sudan (beverage), a traditional Korean punch
Sudan (film), a 1945 historical drama
Sudan (rhinoceros) (1973–2018), a northern white rhinoceros at the Ol Pejeta Conservancy in Kenya
Sudan (ship), the PS Sudan, a Nile steamer
Sudan (tribe), a settled Bedouin tribe of the United Arab Emirates.
Sudan function, in mathematics, named after Gabriel Sudan
Sudan grass, a grass

See also
Soudan (disambiguation)
SUDAAN, statistical software